Vince's Bridge was a wooden bridge constructed by Allen Vince over Vince Bayou near Harrisburg, Texas. Its destruction by Texian Army Rangers played a critical role during the April 1836 Battle of San Jacinto in the decisive defeat of the Mexican army, which effectively ended the Texas Revolution. Located on the most likely possible route of escape for Antonio López de Santa Anna and his column of the Mexican army, the burning of Vince's Bridge helped prevent his soldiers from reaching the safety of nearby reinforcements.

References

External links 
 Young Perry Alsbury Letter
 Santa Anna's Letter
Santa Anna's Account of the Battle
Account of the battle by Creed Taylor
San Jacinto
Vince's Bridge
 San Jacinto
 Historical Marker

Texas Revolution
Bridges in Texas
Wooden bridges in the United States